Derek Ansell is a British novelist and biographer.

A regular contributor to Jazz Journal and Newbury Weekly News, Ansell's first novel. The Whitechapel Murders, was published by Citron Press in 1999. In 2008, he published the first biography of saxophonist Hank Mobley.

His novel, A Safe Place To Stay, a novel set during WWII, was published in 2018.

Derek has five grandchildren.

Publications
 2008: Workout: The Music of Hank Mobley   Northway Publications, London.
 2012: Sugar Free Saxophone: The Life and Music of Jackie McLean Northway Publications, London
 2013:  My Brother's Keeper :  novel published by Chiado Publishing, Portugal & worldwide.
 2014:  Sex & Sensibility :    novel published by Dark Hollows Press USA.

The Bradgate Heiress published by Creativia Publishing in 2018 is a fictional account of the life of Lady Jane Grey in Tudor times.

References

British music critics
Living people
Jazz writers
21st-century British novelists
British male novelists
Year of birth missing (living people)
Place of birth missing (living people)
21st-century British male writers